The 1st Minnesota Cavalry Regiment, also known as the Mounted Rangers, was a   Minnesota USV cavalry regiment that served in the Union Army during the American Civil War.

The 1st Minnesota Cavalry Regiment was mustered between October and December 1862 in at St. Cloud, St. Peter and  Fort Snelling for one year's service, and the men were mustered out between October and December 1863. The 1st Minnesota Cavalry served entirely in Minnesota and the Dakota Territory, guarding the frontier against the hostile Sioux Indians.

Battles and campaigns
Sibley's Expedition against Indians in Dakota Territory, June 16 to September 14, 1863.
Battle of Big Mound, July 24, 1863.
Battle of Dead Buffalo Lake, July 26, 1863.
Battle of Stony Lake, July 28, 1863.
Operations along the Missouri River, July 28 to 30, 1863.

Colonels
 Samuel McPhaill

Casualties and total strength
The 1st Minnesota Cavalry lost two officers and four enlisted men killed in action or died of wounds received in battle. An additional 31 enlisted men died of disease. Total fatalities were 37.

See also
 List of Minnesota Civil War Units

References
 Annual Report of the Adjutant General, of the State of Minnesota, for the Year Ending December 1, 1866, and of the Military Forces of the State from 1861 to 1866. Saint Paul [Minn.]: Pioneer Printing Company, 1866. The "First Regiment Mounted Rangers, Minnesota Volunteers" begins on page 633.

External links
The Civil War Archive Website
Minnesota Historical Society page on Minnesota and the Civil War

Units and formations of the Union Army from Minnesota
1862 establishments in Minnesota
Military units and formations established in 1862
Military units and formations disestablished in 1863
1863 disestablishments in the United States